Saxifraga cotyledon, the pyramidal saxifrage, occurs in the mountains of Europe and has rosettes about  across of tongue-shaped leaves, beaded but not toothed. In May or June the tall panicles of white flowers, branched and pyramidal in outline, may reach . It is one of Norway's two national flowers (chosen in 1935). Its relationship to the "silver saxifrages" (Saxifraga sect. Ligulatae) remains to be resolved to full satisfaction.

Distribution
Saxifraga cotyledon has an Arctic–alpine distribution, occurring in Scandinavia, Iceland, the Western Alps and the Pyrenees.

Horticulture
To produce flowers it sometimes is necessary to remove and save for propagation all side rosettes. The flowering rosette dies after blooming.

References

External links

cotyledon
Garden plants
Flora of Europe
Plants described in 1753
Taxa named by Carl Linnaeus